Kemal Bilbaşar (born  1910, Çanakkale - 21 January 1983, Istanbul), was a Turkish writer.

Biography 
He was born in Çanakkale. His father is Hüsnü Naim Efendi, a police chief commissioner from the Caucasus, and his mother is Nuriye Hanım, who is an immigrant from Bulgaria. Naim Efendi, who graduated from Sofia University, went to Thessaloniki as the police chief after his appointment came out after serving in Çanakkale for a while. Upon the death of Naim Efendi, who worked here for a while, the family migrated to Çanakkale, his previous place of duty. The family had to leave here in 1915 after the Çanakkale front was also bombarded during World War I.

Bibliography

Story 

 Anadolu'dan Hikayeler - 1939
 Cevizli Bahçe - 1941
 Pembe Kurt - 1953
 Üç Bulutlu Hikayeler - 1956
 Irgatların Öfkesi - 1971
 Pazarlık - 1944
 Köyden Kentten - 1961

Novel 

 Denizin Çağırışı - 1943
 Ay Tutulduğu Gece - 1961
 Cemo - 1966
 Memo - 1970
 Yeşil Gölge - 1970
 Yonca Kız - 1971
 Başka Olur Ağaların Düğünü - 1972
 Kölelik Dönemeci - 1977
 Bedoş - 1980
 Zühre Ninem - 1981

References

Notes 

 

1910 births
1983 deaths
Writers from Istanbul